Manuka or Mānuka may refer to:
The flowering plant Leptospermum scoparium ( in the Māori language)
Manuka, Australian Capital Territory, an area in Canberra, named after the plant
Manuka Oval, a stadium in the above territory
Manuka Football Club, a defunct Australian Rules Football club that played in the stadium
Manuka Primary School in Witheford Heights, North Shore, New Zealand
Manuka Gorge, a canyon close to Waitahuna in New Zealand

Mānuka honey, a monofloral honey
Mānuka (canoe), from Māori tradition
Manuka State Wayside Park and forest reserve, a park on the Island of Hawaii

Gentian Manuka (born 1991), Albanian footballer
SS Manuka, a Union Company cargo ship.